The golden takin (Budorcas taxicolor bedfordi) is an endangeredgoat-antelope (takin), native to the Qin Mountains in China's southern Shaanxi province. Golden takins have unique adaptations that help them stay warm and dry during cold Himalayan winters. Their large snout has sinus cavities that heat inhaled air, preventing the loss of body heat during respiration.  They grow a thick, secondary coat as protection from the weather as well as secreting an oily substance that protects them from rain.

Description

The golden takin is a large, muscular, hoofed takin sometimes referred to as a "goat-antelope", as it possesses similar traits to goats and antelope, and is most closely related to sheep, aoudad, or Barbary sheep of North Africa. Split hooves help takins move around easily in their rocky habitat. Its muzzle has a distinctive convex shape, akin to a "Roman nose". Takins lack skin glands around their head, groin and hooves, instead exhibiting an oily skin secretion that is said to smell "goat-like". This dark secretion causes their coat to appear more darkly pigmented, but can be washed out by the rain to reveal a lighter fur, especially in females. Body hairs of golden takin are white or off-white, but the hairs in neck and fore-chest are golden in adult males. Only the horns, hooves and naked areas of the nostrils are shiny black. The ears are short, narrow and pointed; the tail is short, triangular and naked on the underside. Calves are easily identified by their smaller body size and brown-gray coat, as well as a dark-brown line of longer fur that extends from the base of their head to their tail. The horns of the calf do not appear until it is six months old.

Each spring, golden takins gather in large herds and migrate up the mountains to the tree line, an altitude above . As cooler weather approaches and food becomes scarce, they move down to forested valleys. Golden takins use the same routes during movement throughout the mountains despite where they are going. This creates a series of well-worn paths through the dense growths of bamboo and rhododendrons that lead to their natural salt licks and grazing areas.

Because of their large, powerful bodies and impressive horns, golden takins have few natural enemies other than bears, wolves, leopards, and dholes. They are generally slow moving but can react quickly if angered or frightened. When needed, they can leap nimbly from rock to rock. If they sense danger, golden takins warn others with a loud "cough" that sends the herd running for cover in the dense underbrush, where they lie down to avoid being seen. Takins can also make an intimidating roar or bellow.

Golden takins eat many kinds of alpine and deciduous plants and evergreens, and almost any vegetation within reach. This includes the tough leaves of evergreen rhododendrons and oaks, willow and pine bark, bamboo leaves, and a variety of new-growth leaves and herbs. They can easily stand on their hind legs, front legs propped against a tree, to reach for higher vegetation if they need to, and use their powerful bodies to push over small trees to bring leaves closer.

Like cows and sheep, golden takins are ruminants and pass food into the first stomach, the rumen, when they first swallow it. Microbes in the rumen help digest very small particles of food. Larger particles pass into a second chamber that regurgitates these particles, called cud, back into the mouth to be chewed into pieces small enough to be digested properly. Golden takins typically eat in the early morning and again in the late afternoon. They spend the day under the cover of dense vegetation, venturing into the open only on cloudy or foggy days.

Golden takins communicate using a variety of body postures. For example, a male shows dominance with an erect posture and a raised neck and chin. He might position his body sideways to another takin to emphasize his size. One signals aggression with a head-down posture, holding its neck horizontal and rigid, with the head and horns hooked to one side. A lowered head, an arched back, snorting, and head crashing often follow prolonged eye contact between individuals.

The scent of another takin's skin or urine offers information, too. In particular, pheromones in a takin's urine may advertise sexual status and identity. To enhance this type of communication, males spray their own forelegs, chest, and face with urine, and females soak their tail when urinating.

Since capture and hunting of the animal is illegal, researchers best bet for chemical research is a fecal sample.

Habitat 
While takins in general can be found throughout the mountainous areas of China, Burma, India and Bhutan, are golden takins are confined to the Qinling Mountains in Shaanxi Province of China.

Herds
The size of herds changes with the seasons: during spring and early summer, herds can number up to 300 animals; during cooler months, when food is less plentiful, the large herds break up into smaller groups of 10 to 35 golden takins as they head up the mountain. Herds are made up of adult females (called cows), kids (young takin), subadults, and young males. Older males, called bulls, are generally solitary except during the rut, or mating season, in late summer. Group sizes are highly variable, influenced, among other things, by subadults gradually breaking off contact with their mother in the course of maturing. Human disturbance is also speculated to be an influential factor, as takins who are disturbed by humans often run in different directions, splitting the group.

Normally solitary, bull takins meet up with herds for a short time during the rut. They bellow loudly to attract cows and notify other bulls of their presence. They may find takin cows by tracking their scent. Once they meet, a bull sniffs and licks the female to determine if she is receptive.

Takin cows seek out areas of dense vegetation to give birth to a single kid in early spring (twins are rare). Within three days of its birth, a takin kid is able to follow its mother through most types of terrain. This is very important if bears or wolves are nearby or if the herd needs to travel a long distance for food. If young Takin are separated from their mother, it lets out a noise to alarm the mother, and the mother answers with a low, guttural call that allows for them to reunite. A takin kid eats solid food and stops nursing at around two months old, although it may continue to stay near its mother until after her next calf is born. Horns begin to grow when the takin kid is about six months old. At birth, takin kids are much darker than adults to give them camouflage from predators; they even have a dark stripe along the back that disappears as the youngsters gets older. Their coat gets lighter in color, longer, and shaggier as they get older.

Reproduction
The gestation period of takins has been reported to be around seven to eight months, resulting in the birth of one calf in the spring. Twins in golden takins are uncommon.

Takins can live around 16 years in the wild and up to 20 in captivity.

References 

 http://animals.sandiegozoo.org/animals/takin#sthash.PE3GvYAb.dpuf
 Creamy-white golden takins in Qinling

golden takin
Mammals of China
Taxa named by Oldfield Thomas